is a Japanese alpine skier and Paralympic Champion.

He competed in the 2006 Winter Paralympics in Turin, Italy, where he became 27th at the Slalom, sitting.

He competed in the 2010 Winter Paralympics in Vancouver, British Columbia, Canada.
He won a gold medal in the Super-G and bronze in the Downhill, sitting. He became 6th at the Slalom, sitting.

He competed in the 2014 Winter Paralympics in Sochi, Russia.
He won a gold medal in the Super-G as well as gold in the Downhill, sitting.

References
 "Athletes." Akira KANO. Organizing Committee of the XXII Olympic Winter Games and XI Paralympic Winter Games of 2014 in Sochi, 2014. Web. 10 Mar. 2014.

External links
 
 

1986 births
Living people
Japanese male alpine skiers
Paralympic alpine skiers of Japan
Paralympic gold medalists for Japan
Paralympic bronze medalists for Japan
Medalists at the 2010 Winter Paralympics
Medalists at the 2014 Winter Paralympics
Alpine skiers at the 2006 Winter Paralympics
Alpine skiers at the 2010 Winter Paralympics
Alpine skiers at the 2014 Winter Paralympics
Alpine skiers at the 2022 Winter Paralympics
Recipients of the Medal with Purple Ribbon
Paralympic medalists in alpine skiing
21st-century Japanese people